Winfield is a city in Putnam County, West Virginia, United States. The population was 2,397 at the 2020 census. It is the county seat of Putnam County.

Winfield is a part of the Huntington-Ashland, WV-KY-OH, Metropolitan Statistical Area (MSA). As of the 2010 census, the MSA had a population of 287,702. New definitions from February 28, 2013 placed the population at 363,000.

History
Winfield was established on a  tract of land owned by Charles Brown. He established a ferry across the river in 1818. The first meeting of the county court was held at the home of Talleyrand P. Brown, in Winfield, on May 22, 1848. The town was incorporated on February 21, 1868, and named in honor of Winfield Scott, the commanding general of the U.S. Army during the Mexican–American War.

The James W. Hoge House, Putnam County Courthouse, and Winfield Toll Bridge are listed on the National Register of Historic Places in 2011.

Geography
Winfield is located at  (38.534455, -81.892206).

Demographics

2010 census
As of the census of 2010, there were 2,301 people, 920 households, and 660 families living in the town. The racial makeup of the town was 95.2% White, 1.2% African American, 0.3% Native American, 0.7% Asian, 0.7% from other races, and 1.8% from two or more races. Hispanic or Latino of any race were 1.1% of the population.

There were 920 households, of which 35.8% had children under the age of 18 living with them, 56.0% were married couples living together, 10.9% had a female householder with no husband present, 4.9% had a male householder with no wife present, and 28.3% were non-families. 24.1% of all households were made up of individuals, and 8.8% had someone living alone who was 65 years of age or older. The average household size was 2.50 and the average family size was 2.96.

The median age in the town was 40.2 years. 26% of residents were under the age of 18; 6.5% were between the ages of 18 and 24; 25.2% were from 25 to 44; 31% were from 45 to 64; and 11.3% were 65 years of age or older. The gender makeup of the town was 48.2% male and 51.8% female.

2000 census
As of the census of 2000, there were 1,858 people, 736 households, and 563 families living in the town. The population density was 694.6 inhabitants per square mile (268.7/km2). There were 777 housing units at an average density of 290.5 per square mile (112.4/km2). The racial makeup of the town was 99.19% White, 0.22% African American, 0.27% Native American, 0.22% Asian, and 0.11% from two or more races. Hispanic or Latino of any race were 0.43% of the population.

There were 736 households, out of which 39.0% had children under the age of 18 living with them, 65.1% were married couples living together, 9.5% had a female householder with no husband present, and 23.5% were non-families. 20.8% of all households were made up of individuals, and 7.3% had someone living alone who was 65 years of age or older. The average household size was 2.52 and the average family size was 2.92.

In the town, the population was spread out, with 25.8% under the age of 18, 6.0% from 18 to 24, 32.2% from 25 to 44, 25.9% from 45 to 64, and 10.1% who were 65 years of age or older. The median age was 38 years. For every 100 females, there were 90.2 males. For every 100 females age 18 and over, there were 86.7 males.

The median income for a household in the town was $51,023, and the median income for a family was $59,196. Males had a median income of $43,885 versus $29,667 for females. The per capita income for the town was $23,564. About 4.5% of families and 4.9% of the population were below the poverty line, including 1.9% of those under age 18 and 5.2% of those age 65 or over.

Notable people
 Jim Lett - Former Major League Baseball Player
 Michael Barber - Former NFL player and College Football Hall of Famer

Education
Putnam County Schools serves the city. Winfield High School and Winfield Middle School are both located along Winfield Road and feature a General as their mascot. Winfield Elementary School is located just off of Winfield Road, on Wall Street.

References

External links
 City website

Towns in Putnam County, West Virginia
Populated places on the Kanawha River
County seats in West Virginia